Gogol is a crater on Mercury. Its name was adopted by the International Astronomical Union (IAU) in 1985. Gogol is named for the Russian playwright Nikolai Gogol, who lived from 1809 to 1852.

The large crater Vālmiki is to the northeast of Gogol.  Bartók is to the east.

References

Impact craters on Mercury